Mohamed Al-Shushe (born 25 May 1955) is a Jordanian sports shooter. He competed in the men's 50 metre rifle, prone event at the 1984 Summer Olympics.

References

1955 births
Living people
Jordanian male sport shooters
Olympic shooters of Jordan
Shooters at the 1984 Summer Olympics
Place of birth missing (living people)